Bulgaria competed at the 1976 Summer Olympics in Montreal, Quebec, Canada. 158 competitors, 105 men and 53 women, took part in 108 events in 14 sports.

Medalists

Gold
 Ivanka Khristova — Athletics, Women's Shot Put
 Svetla Otsetova and Zdravka Yordanova — Rowing, Women's Double Sculls 
 Siyka Kelbecheva and Stoyanka Kubatova-Gruicheva — Rowing, Women's Coxless Pairs
 Norair Nurikyan — Weightlifting, Men's Bantamweight
 Yordan Mitkov — Weightlifting, Men's Middleweight
 Hasan Isaev — Wrestling, Men's Freestyle Light Flyweight

Silver
 Nikolina Shtereva — Athletics, Women's 800 metres
 Mariya Vergova — Athletics, Women's Discus Throw
 Kapka Georgieva-Panayotova, Ginka Gyurova, Mariyka Modeva and Reni Yordanova — Rowing, Women's Coxed Fours 
 Georgi Todorov — Weightlifting, Men's Featherweight
 Trendafil Stoychev — Weightlifting, Men's Light Heavyweight 
 Krastyu Semerdzhiev — Weightlifting, Men's Heavyweight
 Stoyan Nikolov — Wrestling, Men's Greco-Roman Light Heavyweight 
 Kamen Goranov — Wrestling, Men's Greco-Roman Heavyweight 
 Aleksandar Tomov — Wrestling, Men's Greco-Roman Super Heavyweight

Bronze
 Yordanka Blagoeva — Athletics, Women's High Jump 
 Vladimir Kolev — Boxing, Men's Light Welterweight 
 Atanas Shopov — Weightlifting, Men's Middle Heavyweight
 Stefan Angelov — Wrestling, Men's Greco-Roman Light Flyweight
 Ivan Kolev — Wrestling, Men's Greco-Roman Middleweight 
 Dimo Kostov — Wrestling, Men's Freestyle Heavyweight 
 Krasimira Bogdanova, Diana Braynova-Dilova, Nadka Golcheva, Krasimira Gyurova, Petkana Makaveeva, Penka Metodieva, Snezhana Mikhaylova, Margarita Shtarkelova, Girgina Skerlatova, Mariya Stoyanova, Penka Stoyanova, and Todorka Yordanova — Basketball, Women's Team Competition

Athletics

Men's 100 metres
 Petar Petrov

Men's 400m Hurdles
 Yanko Bratanov
 Heats — 51.84s
 Semi Final — 50.11s
 Final — 50.03s (→ 6th place)

Men's Discus Throw
 Velko Velev
 Qualification — 63.54m 
 Final — 60.94m (→ 10th place)

Men's Javelin Throw
 Valentin Dzhonev

Women's 200 metres
Liliyana Panayotova-Ivanova

Women's 800 metres
Nikolina Shtereva
Svetla Zlateva  
Liliyana Todorova

Women's 1,500 metres
Nikolina Shtereva
Vesela Yatsinska
Rositsa Pekhlivanova

Women's 100 metres Hurdles
Penka Sokolova

Women's 4×400 metres Relay
Yordanka Ivanova, Svetla Zlateva, Ivanka Bonova, and Liliyana Todorova

Women's High Jump
Yordanka Blagoeva

Women's Long Jump
Liliyana Panayotova-Ivanova
Ekaterina Nedeva

Women's Shot Put
Ivanka Khristova
Final — 21.16 m (→  Gold Medal)
Elena Stoyanova
Final — 18.89 m (→ 8th place)

Women's Discus Throw
Mariya Vergova

Women's Javelin Throw
Yordanka Peeva

Women's Pentathlon
Penka Sokolova

Basketball

Women's tournament

Team Roster
Nadka Golcheva
Penka Metodieva
Petkana Makaveyeva
Snezhana Mihailova
Krassima Gyurova
Krassimira Bogdanova
Todorka Yordanova
Diana Dilova
Margarita Shturkelova
Mania Stoyanova
Girgina Skerlatova
Penka Stoyanova
Head coach: Ivan Galabov

Boxing

Men

Canoeing

Sprint
Men

Women

Cycling

Six cyclists represented Bulgaria in 1976.

Road

Track
1000m time trial

Men's Sprint

Fencing

Five fencers, all men, represented Bulgaria in 1976.

Men's sabre
 Miroslav Dudekov
 Anani Mikhaylov
 Trayan Dimitrov

Men's team sabre
 Miroslav Dudekov, Anani Mikhaylov, Konstantin Dzhelepov, Khristo Khristov

Gymnastics

Judo

Men

Modern pentathlon

Three male pentathletes represented Bulgaria in 1976.

Individual
 Stoyan Zlatev
 Velko Bratanov
 Nikolay Nikolov

Team
 Stoyan Zlatev
 Velko Bratanov
 Nikolay Nikolov

Rowing

Men

Women

Shooting

Open

Swimming

Men

Weightlifting

Men

Wrestling

References

External links
Official Olympic Reports
International Olympic Committee results database

Nations at the 1976 Summer Olympics
1976 Summer Olympics
1976 in Bulgarian sport